Carex media, also known as closed-headed sedge and Montana sedge, is a tussock-forming perennial in the family Cyperaceae. It is native to Canada, parts of the United States, Russia, Finland, Sweden, and Norway.

See also
 List of Carex species

References

media
Plants described in 1823
Flora of North America
Flora of Europe
Taxa named by Robert Brown (botanist, born 1773)